This is a listing of the horses that finished in either first, second, or third place and the number of starters in the Breeders' Cup Distaff, a Grade I race for fillies and mares, three years old and up. An annual race run on the dirt, it was the final race of the first-day (Friday) card of the Breeders' Cup World Thoroughbred Championships since 2008. In 2018, it was returned to the Saturday card.

The race, which has been run in every Breeders' Cup since the first event in 1984, was known as the Breeders' Cup Ladies Classic between 2008 and 2012.

References

External links
 Breeders' Cup official website

Distaff/Ladies Classic
Lists of horse racing results